Dave Porter is an American composer, best known for the original score for the television series Breaking Bad, its prequel spin-off Better Call Saul and the epilogue film El Camino: A Breaking Bad Movie. At Sarah Lawrence College, Porter studied classical and electronic music composition.

Breaking Bad 
For his work on Breaking Bad, Porter has won an ASCAP Award. Bryan Cranston, who portrays Walter White, stated "With his music, Dave Porter has created another character for Breaking Bad. Evocative and meaningful, Dave's work is an essential part of the storytelling." Porter stated that influences on the series' music came from discussions with Vince Gilligan, the creator of Breaking Bad, about the show having aspects of a post-modern western. For the final episodes of the series, Porter incorporated four important themes that were in previous seasons.

Other work 
Porter currently composes music for NBC's crime thriller The Blacklist.

Personal life 
Porter has a wife, Jeanine, a son, and a daughter.

Filmography

Discography

References

External links
 – official site

20th-century births
21st-century American composers
American television composers
Sarah Lawrence College alumni
Living people
Year of birth missing (living people)